Namalycastis jaya is a species of brackish-water polychaete worm in the family Nereididae known from the southern coast of Kerala in southwest India.

Type locality: Thiruvananthapuram coast, Kerala, India, 8°36'57.47"N, 76°49'8.914"E

Etymology: The worm is named for Tamil Nadu Chief minister J. Jayalalitha who developed education in Tamil Nadu.

References

Phyllodocida
Animals described in 2012